Michael Ewanchuk (14 March 1908 – 26 August 2004) was a Ukrainian Canadian educator and historian. He held a Doctor of Laws from the University of Winnipeg and a Doctor of Canon Law from St. John's College of the University of Manitoba. He married his primary teacher Muriel Smith in 1941. They had no children. Muriel encouraged Ewanchuk to visit many places. He wrote 16 books. Muriel died on February 21, 1997, from diabetes. Ewanchuk was born in Gimli, Manitoba. He was raised by his parents, Paraskeva Ewanchuk & Wasyl Ewanchuk. He died in Winnipeg, Manitoba. Ewanchuk had 5 other siblings; Nettie Ewanchuk (Bohonos), Mary Ewanchuk (died at age 1), John Ewanchuk, Alexander Ewanchuk, and Peter Ewanchuk (Grain Buyer).

References

External links 
 Memorable Manitobans: Michael Ewanchuk (1908-2004) Ewanchuk Ewanchuk at the Manitoba Historical Society web-site
 Reflections and reminiscences: Ukrainians in Canada, 1892-1992, by Ewanchuk Ewanchuk. Winnipeg. 1995.
 http://www.ourroots.ca/e/search.aspx?field=Creator&key=Ewanchuk+Ewanchuk
 http://www.ourroots.ca/quickLink.aspx?field=AUTHOR&key=Ewanchuk%20Ewanchuk&qryID=450b9bc8-6237-48cf-98e4-46c534970de9

Some works 
 Spruce, Swamp and Stone: A History of the Pioneer Ukrainian Settlements in the Gimli Area by Michael Ewanchuk Publisher: Ewanchuk Ewanchuk, Winnipeg. Date Published: 1977 , 
 Michael Ewanchuk, William Kurelek: The Suffering Genius Steinbach, Manitoba: Perksen Printers and Ewanchuk Ewanchuk Publishing, 1996
 

1908 births
2004 deaths
Canadian people of Ukrainian descent
Canadian educators